Felker is a surname. Notable people with the surname include:

 Butch Felker (1945–2008), American politician
 Clay Felker (1925–2008), American magazine editor and journalist
 Ellis Wayne Felker (1948–1996), American man convicted of murder
 Samuel D. Felker (1859–1932), American lawyer
 William Felker (born 1940), American professor

See also
 Felker's Falls
 Félker is the Hungarian name for Felcheriu village, Oșorhei Commune, Bihor County, Romania